The Anglican Church of St Mary in Laverton, Lullington, Somerset, England was built in the 11th century. It is a Grade II* listed building.

History
The church was built in the 11th century and restored in the 15th and 19th centuries. Surviving parts of the Norman structure include the entrance arch and pillars.

The parish is part of the Hardington Vale benefice within the Diocese of Bath and Wells.

Architecture
The stone building has a slate and tile roof. It consists of a nave and chancel each of one bay. The west tower is supported by diagonal buttresses. The tower used to house three bells but only one remains.

References

11th-century church buildings in England
Church of England church buildings in Mendip District
Grade II* listed buildings in Mendip District
Grade II* listed churches in Somerset